Golden sparrow may refer to:

 Sudan golden sparrow or golden song sparrow, a bird
 Arabian golden sparrow, a bird
 Golden Sparrow, a character played by Liu Yifeiin the 2008 film The Forbidden Kingdom

Animal common name disambiguation pages